Sir Winston Churchill High School is a senior high school in Calgary, Alberta, Canada. It derives its name from Sir Winston Churchill, two-term prime minister of the United Kingdom. The high school is built in the Northwest community of Brentwood. The school offers the International Baccalaureate (IB) programme, various second languages, and numerous clubs and teams.

Academics
Churchill is known for being Calgary's North West designated International Baccalaureate school. The vast majority of its graduates attend post-secondary institutions across the world. Churchill is considered one of Alberta's leading schools for academics, regularly placing highly in the city and the province and in national math competitions, poetry contests, and science competitions, including the Science Olympics.

International Baccalaureate programme
The IB Diploma/Certificate programme begins in the middle of a student's grade 10 year with Math and/or Physics/Biology/Business Management. Other IB courses begin during the grade 11 year and include Art, Chemistry, Computer Science, World History, English, French and Mandarin. This academic program is demanding but encourages students to be well-rounded individuals. During their grade 11 year, IB students taking, at least, one of the IB Group 4 subjects are required to complete a science fair style project, demonstrating their knowledge of the scientific concepts behind a topic of their choosing. During their grade 12 year, IB Diploma students will work on an involved, self-instructed and teacher-guided essay on a topic of their choice, known as the Extended Essay. Students taking History, regardless of Diploma or Certificate involvement also complete an Internal Assessment, similar to the Extended Essay.

Athletics
The school's athletic teams competes and participates in the Calgary Zone of the Alberta Schools Athletic Association.

Various sports are played within school, and school teams of SWC are strong competitors among the Calgary Senior High schools. They have been crowned Overall Champions in Wrestling, Badminton, Basketball, Rugby, Swimming, Diving, Soccer, Field Hockey, Table Tennis, and Volleyball.
The School's Swimming, Basketball and Wrestling are the most distinguished among all.

The Junior Boys Volleyball team in 2000 won City Championship. The same group of athletes on the senior team in 2002 and 2003 also won the city championship. This is the only volleyball team in the city and province to win 3 years of city championships. In 2002 the volleyball team also won provincials under the coaching of Al Taylor.
In 2001 the Junior football team won city championships against their rivals who clobbered them in regular season 48–6.

In 2006, five different teams won awards in various divisional and city championships. Churchill fielded a Senior Boys Rugby team for the first time in many years. The team went undefeated in the regular season and took home the city championship for Div II Rugby with a 30–22 win over Queen Elizabeth High School.

In the 2007 to 2008 school year, the Bulldogs came out on top snatching many city titles. Among them include Junior Boys Soccer, Senior Boys Basketball, Senior Girls Basketball and Senior Girls Field Hockey.

In the 2008 to 2009 school year, the Bulldogs again came out on top snatching many city titles. Among them include Junior Boys Volleyball, Senior Boys Basketball, Girls Rugby and Girls Wrestling.

Continuing the legacy of Sir Winston Churchill, Churchillians was crowned in many different sports during the school year of 2010–2011, including Junior Boys Volleyball, Girls Wrestling, Diving, Intermediate Boys Cross Country, Junior Boys Basketball, and Senior Boys Rugby.

In the 2012–2013 school year, Churchillians once again surpass its limits, and crowned in many sports, including Junior Boys Football, Senior Boys Volleyball, Senior Girls Basketball, both Junior and Senior Field Hockey and both Boys/Girls Wrestling

In the 2013–2014 school year, Sir Winston Churchill High School Swim Team won the City Championship while setting a new City record of 1082.17 points. The Sir Winston Churchill High School Dive Team also finished in second.

In 2014–2015 school year, Sir Winston Churchill High School Cross Country Team captured both Junior and Senior Boys Championship.

In the 2014–2015 school year, Sir Winston Churchill Swim Team once again captured first place in the Inter-School Swimming Competition.

Recently, Sir Winston Churchill Swim Team has captured the Inter-School Swimming Competition Championship for a record of 6 consecutive years.

The fine arts and performing arts

School productions 
SWC prides itself on its well-developed Theatre and Musical Theatre programs. Each year a large scale production is presented, giving any interested students a chance to show off their exceptional skills. As a final project in grade 12, students in both Performing Arts programs are given the opportunity to direct or stage-manage their own, student driven, 45-minute productions. Each production is presented in the evenings in the theatre, giving students and staff a chance to view them. Many Drama 30 students have been fortunate enough to have their pieces presented at the Calgary Drama Festival, and for the past several years, more than one student's production has been submitted for viewing, a rarity in the festival.

Sir Winston Churchill High School music program 
The band program of Sir Winston Churchill is conducted by Philip Rounding and Rachelle Henkel. Churchill's bands include the Concert Band, the Symphonic Band, the Blue Jazz Band, the Jazz Army Band, the Jazz Combo, the Choir, and the Percussion Ensemble. At the beginning of each year, students wishing to enter the school bands attend band auditions. The student's skills are judged and then placed in either the Concert or Symphonic band. Those of a high skill level are placed in the Symphonic band, while most tenth-grade and some eleventh-grade students are placed in the Concert Band. A small percentage of highly skilled grade ten students may find themselves placed in the Symphonic Band, which plays music at grade 5 through 6 music levels. With both the Concert and Symphonic bands, students must take corresponding courses in the school year. Those students who have schedule conflicts due to IB courses must attend IB-Band classes at lunch (these classes are not according to an IB curriculum, the name is simply because the students are in other IB courses, and do not have room in their timetable to attend the regular class).

The Blue-Jazz, Jazz-army, and Jazz Combo bands, as well as the Percussion Ensemble, are entirely volunteer-based as well. Students are allowed into Blue Jazz if they have exceptional skill at jazz music and play the appropriate instruments. Otherwise, they may choose to be part of the Jazz Army. Percussion Ensemble consists of percussion instruments, which include drums, xylophones, timpanis, vibraphones, pianos, maracas, and a variety of other percussion instruments. None of these groups have a corresponding in-school class that students have to attend.

Both the Concert and Symphonic Bands at Sir Winston Churchill are composed of woodwind, brass, low woodwind, low brass, and percussion instruments. The only string instrument in the band is the low string bass. The Jazz Army and Blue-Jazz bands also have an electric bass and sometimes an electric guitar. The jazz bands (usually) consist of brass instruments, whilst the Concert and Symphonic Bands are composed mainly of woodwind-type instruments.

Each year, Sir Winston Churchill bands attend several competitions, including the Alberta inter-city competition, Alberta International Band Festival, and several other inter-province band festivals. All bands also go on an annual band trip, to spend a few days in another city, where they perform and record the annual Sir Winston Churchill CD (recorded by DarkMatter Productions). On the last evening of each trip, students attend a formal dinner with one another, followed by the awarding of section-leader awards, as well as the various medals of achievement earned by students.

The Symphonic and Concert Bands also perform at the Sir Winston Churchill Graduation ceremony. The Symphonic Band plays a piece that the students have chosen, whilst the concert band plays march-style pieces at the entrance and exit of the graduates.

Extracurricular activities and clubs 
Churchill's Model United Nations team is one of the strongest in Western Canada. In 2014, the MUN team took home city championships as well as several national awards. In 2015, the MUN team claimed city championships once more, and in 2016, did the same. Also in 2016, the MUN team won first place at SSUNS in Montreal, first place at WAMUN, and first place at WCHSMUN. In the 2017–2018 school year, the MUN team won first place at SSUNS for the third year in the row, won the Westmount Charter Model United Nations Conference for the second year in a row, and came back from the NHSMUN conference with an award of merit. They also won the city championship for the fifth year in a row in February. One of its students also took home a best delegate award at the Harvard Model United Nations conference in January 2018. During the 2018–19 school year the team once again won Best Small Delegation at SSUNS for the fourth year in a row and also won the same award at its first performance at the Canadian High Schools Model UN Conference in Vancouver. The team also won various Best Delegations in Calgary conferences, won numerous awards at its first performance at the MUNUC conference in Chicago, and came second at the city championships.  Churchill has its own conference, SWCHSMUN, which is run by students. Registration is open to almost any high school student. In its most recent conference, Churchill hosted schools from across the province, and even brought in a school from Houston, Texas.

Churchill also has two well-equipped weight rooms. Students can join the 'Fitness Club' and can purchase memberships for a small price, (now made free, if a small written fitness test is passed) and can work out in the morning, at lunch, and after school. The weight room offers a variety of equipment and well-trained teachers to help instruct students on proper techniques and help as spotters when needed.

Churchill has been extremely successful in various scientific competitions, such as APEGA Science Olympics, SET Challenge, and Science Fair. As a competitor in the Calgary Youth Science Fair, Sir Winston Churchill High School has been awarded the BP High School Aggregate Award in 2016 and 2017, recognizing Churchill as the high school with the highest average marks between all participants. Many Churchill alumni have been selected to represent Alberta at the Canada-Wide Science Fair — where numerous individuals have received top honors. Notable examples of these alumni include Shi Haofeng; where he has received extensive national media coverage for his research.

Churchill hosts an annual debate tournament sponsored by the Calgary Churchill Society.

Churchill's International FIRST Robotics Competition team was started in 2013, and came to an end after the closure of the 2015 FRC season.

-In 2014, Churchill's Robotics Team (FRC Team 4719) won the 2014 FRC Western Canada Regional Competition and advanced to the 2014 FIRST Championship.

-In the following year, Churchill's robotics team seeded first and won the 2015 Western Canada Regional again, winning a coveted spot to the 2015 FRC World Championship, and the Quality Award.

Sir Winston Churchill High School is also the home of some of the best VEX Robotics teams in the province.

- In 2015 and 2016, Sir Winston Churchill teams 3388 Foobar and 3388T TurboTech won the VEX robotics Alberta Provincial Championship "Skyrise" and "Nothing But Net" and competed in VEX World robotics Championship.

- In 2017, Churchill's team 3388B Bulldog and 3388T TurboTech competed in the VEX Provincial Championship "Starstruck" and finished third and seventh respectively for qualification and second and third respectively for skills challenge. And they went on to represent Canada to compete in VEX World robotics championship. Team 3388B bulldog later became the highest ranked Albertan team in the VEX World Robotics Championship "Starstruck" in April 2017.

- In 2018, Churchill's team 3388X "Madeline" was Tournament Champion in the VEX Alberta Provincial Championship "In The Zone". They qualified for and will be representing Canada in the VEX World Robotics Championship in April in Louisville, Kentucky.

Clubs

Notable alumni 
Bob Bassen - former NHL forward
Roman Danylo (1987) - Comedian on CTV's Comedy Inc. and previously The Holmes Show.
Sam Effah - Represented Canada at the 2010 Commonwealth Games in Track and Field
John Fawcett (1986) - Director of film and television shows such as Ginger Snaps and Orphan Black
Brandon Firla - Actor and comedian in Billable Hours and Little Mosque on the Prairie
Terri Hawkes — Actress, screenwriter and playwright. Best known for voicing Sailor Moon (in English), playing Wendy Masters on General Hospital and writing the screenplay for The Book Of Eve.
Matt Lambros - Professional Canadian Football League wide receiver for the Toronto Argonauts
Raghav - Canadian pop singer and recording artist.
Todd McFarlane, comic book creator and entrepreneur, best known for his work on The Amazing Spider-Man and the horror-fantasy series Spawn.
Cale Makar, NHL Defenseman, 2022 Conn Smythe Trophy winner, 2022 Norris Trophy winner, and 2022 Stanley Cup champion.
Peter Oldring (1987) - Actor who had a role in films K-19: The Widowmaker and Lost and Delirious, as well as various comedic television programs.
Riza Santos - Miss Canada 2013, and second-place winner on the Filipino reality TV show, Pinoy Big Brother
Ashwin Sood (1985) - Recording artist, drummer and former husband of Sarah McLachlan
Fiona Staples - Comic book artist.
Karl Tilleman - Basketball player on Canada's Olympic team.  (Tilleman holds the Olympic record for the most three-point baskets in a single basketball game).
Curtis Waters - Musician and Songwriter, best known for his 2020 debut single “Stunnin”

References

External links 

 

Educational institutions established in 1968
High schools in Calgary
International Baccalaureate schools in Alberta
1968 establishments in Alberta